Ichthyborus is a genus of distichodontid fishes found in tropical Africa. They are piscivores that feed both on (whole) fish and fins of fish.

Species
There are five recognized species:

 Ichthyborus besse (de Joannis, 1835)
 Ichthyborus congolensis Giltay, 1930
 Ichthyborus monodi (Pellegrin, 1927)
 Ichthyborus ornatus (Boulenger, 1899)
 Ichthyborus quadrilineatus (Pellegrin, 1904)

References

Distichodontidae
Fish of Africa
Taxa named by Albert Günther